The 1995 Auckland Warriors season was the inaugural season of the newly-formed club. Competing the 1995 Australian Rugby League premiership, they were coached by John Monie and captained by Dean Bell. The Warriors' home ground for their first season was Ericsson Stadium. They finished their first premiership regular season 10th (out of 20), so failed to make the finals.

Milestones 
 10 March - Round One: The Warriors play their inaugural game against the Brisbane Broncos. A crowd of 29,220 watch the Warriors go down 25-22 to the Broncos, after leading them throughout the game.
 16 March - Round Three: The Warriors are docked two competition points for using an extra interchange player in a win over the Western Suburbs Magpies. They would ultimately miss out on the finals by two points. The fifth interchange player was sent on as a blood bin replacement, with the coaching staff not realising this was against the rules.
 23 April - Round Seven: Stacey Jones makes his debut for the Warriors, scoring six points in a win over Parramatta.
 4 June - Round Eleven: The final two members of the squad, Frano Botica and Denis Betts, make their debuts for the Warriors after completing the English season for Wigan.
 October: 18 players from the club participated in the World Cup: Denis Betts, Andy Platt (England), Richie Blackmore, Syd Eru, Sean Hoppe, Stacey Jones, Stephen Kearney, Gene Ngamu, Hitro Okesene (New Zealand), Duane Mann (Tonga), Willie Poching, Tea Ropati, Se'e Solomona, Willie Swann, Tony Tatupu, Tony Tuimavave, Joe Vagana and Nigel Vagana (Western Samoa). In addition, Frank Endacott coached New Zealand.

Jersey & Sponsors

Fixtures 

The Warriors used Ericsson Stadium as their home ground in 1995, and it remained the only Home Ground the club used in the competition until they played a match at Eden Park in 2011.

Pre-Season 
Three pre-season matches were played before the World Sevens and another three were played after the World Sevens.

World Sevens 
The Warriors participated in the 1995 Rugby League World Sevens, losing in the Trophy Quarterfinals.

Squad: Phil Blake (c), Sean Hoppe, Manoa Thompson, Tea Ropati, Whetu Taewa, Gene Ngamu, Syd Eru, Stephen Kearney, Tony Tatupu, Des Maea.

Tooheys Challenge Cup 
Team: Phil Blake (c), Sean Hoppe, Dean Bell, Manoa Thompson, Whetu Taewa, Martin Moana, Gene Ngamu, Gavin Hill, Duane Mann, Hitro Okesene, Stephen Kearney, Tony Tatupu, Tony Tuimavave. Bench: Tea Ropati, Se'e Solomona, Mike Dorreen, Jason Mackie.

Regular season 

*The Warriors were stripped the 2 competition points from winning this game due to exceeding the replacement limit.

Ladder 

*Auckland Warriors were stripped of 2 competition points due to exceeding the replacement limit in one game.

Squad 

Twenty Eight players were used by the club in 1995.

Staff 
 Chairman: Peter McLeod
 Chief executive Officer: Ian Robson
 Football manager: Laurie Stubbing

Coaching staff 
 Head coach: John Monie
 Reserve grade coach: Frank Endacott
 Coaching & development manager: Bob Hall
 U16 grade coach & development officer: John Ackland
 U16 grade co-coach: Brian McClennan

Other teams 
The Warriors participated in the ARL's Reserve grade competition that mirrored the senior draw. The Reserve grade side made the top eight, finishing eighth, but lost to Penrith 8-14 in the Quarterfinals.

In the Club Championship the Warriors finished seventh overall.

Warriors Colts 

In addition a Warriors Colts side was fielded in NZRL's Lion Red Cup. The Warrior Colts made the grand final but lost to the North Harbour Sea Eagles.

After trailing 15–2 at halftime the North Harbour Sea Eagles came from behind to defeat the Warrior Colts 28–21 in the second Lion Red Cup Grand Final. The match included an eight-point try scored by Paki Tuimavave in the 48th minute. Tuimavave was tackled high by Aaron Lester while he was grounding the ball. Lester was then sin-binned for back chatting the referee after the incident.

Awards 
Tea Ropati won the club's Player of the Year award.

Super League 

The Auckland Warriors, along with seven other clubs, signed with News Limited to form a new competition in 1996, the Super League. Thirteen players signed with the new competition on 2 April 1995, after the Warriors' Round 4 loss to the North Sydney Bears, with coach John Monie having signed in late March. The club as a whole signed with News Limited on 20 April. This decision meant that Auckland Warriors players became ineligible for the New South Wales and Queensland State of Origin sides and the Australian Kangaroos. The New Zealand Rugby League and English Rugby Football League organisations had also signed with News Limited and so the majority of Warriors players were still eligible to represent their countries at the 1995 Rugby League World Cup.

References

External links 
 Warriors official site
 1995 Warriors Season rugbyleagueproject.org
 Becht, Richard. A New Breed Rising: The Warriors Winfield Cup Challenge. Auckland, HarperCollins, 1994. 

New Zealand Warriors seasons
Auckland Warriors season
Auckland Warriors season